Signe Weisert (23 May 1923 – 15 August 2000) was a Norwegian politician for the Conservative Party.

She served as a deputy representative to the Parliament of Norway from Oppland during the term 1977–1981. In total she met during 39 days of parliamentary session.

References

1923 births
2000 deaths
Deputy members of the Storting
Conservative Party (Norway) politicians
Oppland politicians
Women members of the Storting
20th-century Norwegian women politicians
20th-century Norwegian politicians